Eupinivora is a genus of moths belonging to the family Tortricidae.

Species
Eupinivora albolineana J.W. Brown, 2013
Eupinivora angulicosta J.W. Brown, 2013
Eupinivora hamartopenis (Razowski, 1986)
Eupinivora ponderosae J.W. Brown, 2013
Eupinivora rufofascia J.W. Brown, 2013
Eupinivora thaumantias (Razowski, 1994)
Eupinivora unicolora J.W. Brown, 2013

See also
List of Tortricidae genera

References

 , 2013: A new genus of pine-feeding Cochylina from the western United States and northern Mexico (Lepidoptera: Tortricidae: Euliini). Zootoxa 03640 (2): 270–283. Abstract: 

Cochylini
Tortricidae genera